"Yuppy Love" is an episode of the BBC sitcom Only Fools and Horses. It originally aired on 8 January 1989 and is the first episode of series six, marking the start of the increase in running time from thirty minutes to fifty minutes per episode.

Synopsis
Having seen and been strongly influenced by the film Wall Street, especially its lead character, the ruthless corporate high-flyer Gordon Gekko, Del Boy has decided to adopt a new "yuppy" image, donning a striped shirt and red braces, and carrying a filofax and a silver briefcase. Rodney in turn has joined an evening computer class in an attempt to earn a diploma and finally get a proper job. His efforts to learn to programme the Amstrad CPC 6128 are mocked by his family. At the computer class Rodney meets and is attracted to Cassandra Parry and meets her again later at a nightclub, where she offers to give him a lift home. She first drives to her house and Rodney feels upstaged by Cassandra's luxurious lifestyle. Embarrassed at the thought of Cassandra seeing their council flat in Nelson Mandela House, Rodney instead leads her to King's Avenue, an expensive and very up market road, implying that he lives there and has to stand in the driveway, being seen by the homeowners. Despite soon finding out that he actually does not Cassandra still phones and agrees to meet Rodney again.

"Falling through the bar" scene
The episode features a scene in which Del, leaning against a bar flap in a local bistro, moves away from it to point some women out to Trigger, and then leans back again, unaware that, in that short space of time, the bartender had just lifted it up. He falls straight down, and Trigger does a double-take when he looks around and finds that Del has "disappeared". On 21 December 2006, this scene was nominated in the UKTV Gold Top 40 Greatest Only Fools Moments, and subsequently voted the most popular scene of the entire programme. It was also named the "7th Greatest Television Moment" of all time in a 1999 Channel 4 poll, beating the likes of John F. Kennedy's assassination, the Queen's coronation and Winston Churchill's funeral. In 2008, Empire placed Only Fools and Horses 42nd on their list of "The 50 Greatest TV Shows of All Time" and cited "Yuppy Love" as the show's best episode.

A similar scene also occurs in Last of the Summer Wine when Eli falls behind the bar.

Episode cast

First appearances 

 Gwyneth Strong as Cassandra Parry

Notes 

 The episode title is a pun on the popular song and saying, Puppy Love.

Episode concept
The new image for Del Boy was based on Gordon Gekko from the movie Wall Street (Rodney mentions that his brother saw the film six times), as part of the yuppy movement that was popular at the time. The episode also introduces Cassandra into the series.

Music
 The Funky Worm: "The Spell! (Get Down With The Genie)"
 Errol Brown: "Love Goes Up And Down"
 The Pasadenas: "Enchanted Lady"
 Chris de Burgh: "The Lady in Red"
 Al Bowlly & Ray Noble: "Makin' Wickey Wackey Down in Waikiki"

Note: "The Spell! (Get Down With The Genie)" and "Enchanted Lady" are removed on the VHS, DVD and iTunes versions and over-dubbed with library music, leading to some scenes of dialogue being removed.

References

External links

1989 British television episodes
Only Fools and Horses (series 6) episodes